tert-Butoxybis(dimethylamino)methane is an organic compound with the formula (CH3)3COCH(N(CH3)2)2.  The compound is classified as an aminal ester, i.e. the tert-butyl alcohol derivative of the aminal bis(dimethylamino)methane.  It is a colorless liquid with a amine odor.

Use as reagent
Also known as Bredereck's reagent, it is used for formylation (introduction of the CHO group).  Protonation releases tert-butyl alcohol, giving tetramethylformamidinium, which displaces active C-H bonds:
(CH3)3COCH(N(CH3)2)2  +  H+  →  (CH3)3COH  +  [CH(N(CH3)2)2]+
[CH(N(CH3)2)2]+  +  CH2Z2  →  Z2CHCH(N(CH3)2)2  +  H+  
The resulting bis(dimethylamino)methyl derivative in turn releases dimethylamine to give an enamine, which hydrolyzes.
Z2CHCH(N(CH3)2)2   →  Z2C=CHN(CH3)2  +  HN(CH3)2
Z2C=CHN(CH3)2  +  H2O  →  Z2CHCHO  +  HN(CH3)2

Preparation
Tert-Butoxybis(dimethylamino)methane is obtained from tetramethylformamidinium chloride by reaction with tert-butoxide. Tetramethylformamidinium salts are obtained by the reaction of dimethylformamide (DMF) with dimethylcarbamoyl chloride

References

Tertiary amines
Dimethylamino compounds
Tert-butyl compounds
Ethers